Penka may refer to:
Proenkephalin, or PENKA, endogenous opioid polypeptide hormone
Karl Penka (1847–1912), Austrian philologist and anthropologist
Penka Kouneva (born 1967), Bulgarian-American composer
Penka Metodieva (born 1950), Bulgarian basketball player
Penka Sokolova (1946–1977), Bulgarian hurdler
Penka Stoyanova (born 1950), Bulgarian basketball player